Gordon French (March 7, 1935 - October 26, 2019) was an American computer engineer and programmer who played a key role in the Homebrew Computer Club. He died on October 26, 2019, in Roseburg, Oregon.

On March 5, 1975, Gordon French hosted the first meeting of the Homebrew Computer Club in his garage,  in Menlo Park, San Mateo County, California. He attended the first three sessions, but when he was offered a post at the Social Security Administration, he moved to Baltimore.

References

American computer specialists
1935 births
2019 deaths
Portland State University alumni
20th-century American businesspeople